Emma Alice Beamish (born 29 November 1982) is an Irish former cricketer who played as a right-handed batter. She appeared in 18 One Day Internationals (ODIs) and 6 Twenty20 Internationals (T20Is) for Ireland between 2003 and 2010. She also played domestic cricket for Surrey, mainly representing their Second XI in the 1999 and 2000 County Championships.

Beamish was born in Dublin. She made her international debut at the 2003 IWCC Trophy, playing ODI matches against the Netherlands and Scotland. Against Scotland, she scored 40 runs at number five in the batting order, which remained the highest score of her career. At the 2005 World Cup in South Africa, Beamish played in five of her team's six matches, but had little success. In her last two matches of the tournament, against Australia and New Zealand, she was used as an opener, partnering Jillian Smythe. After the World Cup, Beamish made regular appearances in Ireland's line-up for several more seasons, both in ODIs and in T20Is. Her last matches for Ireland came in August 2012, in a European tournament that was part of the qualification process for the 2014 World Twenty20.

References

External links

1982 births
Living people
Ireland women One Day International cricketers
Ireland women Twenty20 International cricketers
Irish women cricketers
Cricketers from Dublin (city)
Surrey women cricketers